The enzyme stipitatonate decarboxylase catalyzes the chemical reaction

stipitatonate  stipitatate + CO2

This enzyme belongs to the family of lyases, specifically the carboxy-lyases, which cleave carbon-carbon bonds.  The systematic name of this enzyme class is stipitatonate carboxy-lyase (decyclizing, stipitatate-forming). This enzyme is also called stipitatonate carboxy-lyase (decyclizing).

References 

 

EC 4.1.1
Enzymes of unknown structure